Paul Neefs (4 July 1933 – 7 May 2009) was a Belgian architect and designer of wall objects and free-standing objects.

In 2007, the house he designed for himself in Oud-Turnhout, Belgium in 1965 was provisionally protected, along with those of several other Belgian architects.

References

External links
In memoriam Paul Neefs (1933–2009) Obituary (in Dutch)
Thomas Daniell Architects, Kyoto > Projects > Exhibition Design > Paul Neefs: A Belgian Architect (three image slideshow, needs Flash)

Belgian architects
Belgian artists
1933 births
2009 deaths